Abhimanyu is a 1990 Indian Kannada-language action drama film written and directed by Ravi Raja Pinisetty. The film cast includes V. Ravichandran, Seetha and Ananth Nag, while many other prominent actors featured in supporting roles. The soundtrack and score composition was by Hamsalekha.

The film was a remake of the Telugu film Ankusam, released in the same year (1990). In a protest sequence, Ravi Teja appeared as a student leader in a small scene.

Cast

Soundtrack 
The music was composed and lyrics were written by Hamsalekha and audio was bought by Lahari Music.

References 

1990 films
1990s Kannada-language films
Indian action drama films
Kannada remakes of Telugu films
Films scored by Hamsalekha
1990s action drama films
Films directed by Ravi Raja Pinisetty
1990 drama films

kn:ಅಭಿಮನ್ಯು